Torche was an American heavy metal band from Miami, Florida. The group formed in 2004 and has released five full-length studio albums, four EPs, two split albums, and three singles. They released their fifth and final full-length studio album, Admission, on July 12, 2019.

Biography

The group was formed in 2004 by Steve Brooks (ex-Floor), Juan Montoya (ex-Floor, ex-Cavity, ex-Ed Matus Struggle), Jonathan Nuñez and Rick Smith (who also played in the grindcore bands Shitstorm, Tyranny of Shaw, Adore Miridia, the screamo band Tunes for Bears to Dance To, and punk band Post-Teens). 
According to MTracks.com: "Their music has a unique, hard-hitting sound that provokes a wide range of emotions, and they have a large fan base throughout the world."
They have toured with Mogwai, Isis, Pelican, Clutch,  Black Cobra, Baroness, Jesu, The Sword, Coheed and Cambria, Stinking Lizaveta, Harvey Milk, Boris, and High on Fire. Steve Brooks, however, has said that they do not consider themselves a metal band. In describing the band's sound, Smith said in an interview: "To me it's mostly a combination of everything we listen to collectively as a band. We take what we like from what we grew up on and use it as creatively as we can. I think the meshing of different sounds comes naturally just because we all have different musical backgrounds yet have a ton of common interests." In terms of touring, Brooks said Torche is getting more of a young crowd.

On April 8, 2008, the band released their second full-length, entitled Meanderthal. It was produced by Kurt Ballou (Converge, Genghis Tron).
It was met with critical acclaim from publications including Decibel Magazine, who ranked Meanderthal No. 1 on their list of the Top 40 Extreme Albums of 2008, and Pitchfork Media, who gave the album an 8.2/10 score in their review. In an interview, Brooks said the band themselves came up with the album's concept in terms of artwork and packaging, along with Aaron Turner. Brooks has also said that in terms of writing material, the band focuses on what they like, rather than worrying about a "backlash" from their fans.

Singer/guitarist Stephen Brooks is one of the few openly gay musicians in the metal scene. He did an interview round table in 2008 on thestranger.com with other openly gay musicians such as Brian Cook (Russian Circles, Sumac, These Arms Are Snakes, Botch), and Juan Velazquez of Abe Vigoda.

In late 2008 Juan Montoya left the band, a move credited to musical differences. Steve Brooks said "He is an amazing guitarist, but we are just not on the same page... but Torche will still carry on as a 3 piece band". As of 2010, Juan Montoya joined up with ex-Bloodsimple members Bevan Davies and Kyle Sanders, and Charlie Suarez of Sunday Driver to create the band "MonstrO" In an interview with Malia James, Brooks revealed that Montoya's departure was acrimonious, and involved physical violence between the two of them.

Torche embarked on tours with bands such as dredg in April 2009, and another with a reunited Harvey Milk. The band opened for Coheed and Cambria on their headlining tour alongside Circa Survive in spring 2010. One of Torche's earliest festival performances was at Incubate in 2006. After that, the band played at SXSW in 2008.

On January 14, 2011, it was announced on the Riverfront Times blog that Andrew Elstner (Riddle of Steel, Tilts) would be joining Torche. The band released their fourth full-length, Restarter, in February 2015 on Relapse Records.

Torche announced their fifth full-length record, Admission on May 19, 2019, with the release of the song Slide. The album was released on Relapse Records July 12, 2019.

In May 2022 founding frontman Steve Brooks announced the upcoming tour supporting Meshuggah would be his last with the band, stating “We’re a few months away from the last tour I’m doing with Torche," he writes. "We’ve been so very lucky and went far beyond what I imagined. I just don’t have it in me to keep this going living on opposite sides of the country. Much love to my band members and everyone that supported us these 18 years! See y’all this Sept/Oct.”

On September, 17, 2022, it was later confirmed in previous comments from a post on Brooks's personal Instagram that the band will not continue without him after their current tour ends. Torche played their final concert on October 16, 2022, opening for Meshuggah and In Flames at the Tabernacle in Atlanta, Georgia.

Members

Final lineup
 Steve Brooks – guitars, vocals (2004–2022)
 Jonathan Nuñez – guitars (2017–2022), bass (2004–2017)
 Rick Smith – drums (2004–2022)
 Eric Hernandez – bass (2017–2022)

Former
 Juan Montoya – guitars (2004 – December 2008)
 Andrew Elstner – guitars, vocals (January 2011 – November 2016)

Touring
 Howard Johnston – live guitars (2010)

Timeline

Discography
Studio albums

EPs

Splits

Singles

Other appearances
Metal Swim - Adult Swim compilation album (2010)
"In Bloom" (originally by Nirvana; tribute album Whatever Nevermind) (2015, Robotic Empire)

References

External links

Robotic Empire (Label US)
Rock Action (Label UK)
Torche Interview
Pics London Underworld 2006 by: Bartolomy

Interview with Steve Brooks of Torche at The Bone Reader
Florida Geek Scene Interviews Torche

2004 establishments in Florida
2022 disestablishments in Florida
American doom metal musical groups
Heavy metal musical groups from Florida
Musical groups established in 2004
Musical groups disestablished in 2022
Musical quartets
American sludge metal musical groups
American stoner rock musical groups